Khrenovets is a rural locality in Brezhnevsky Selsoviet Rural Settlement, Kursky District, Kursk Oblast, Russia. Population:

Geography 
The village is located on the Khrenovets Brook (a right tributary of the Malaya Kuritsa in the Seym River basin), 88.5 km from the Russia–Ukraine border, 26.5 km north-west of Kursk, 13 km from the selsoviet center – Verkhnekasinovo.

 Climate
Khrenovets has a warm-summer humid continental climate (Dfb in the Köppen climate classification).

Transport 
Khrenovets is located 10.5 km from the federal route  Crimea Highway (a part of the European route ), 4 km from the road of intermunicipal significance  ("Crimea Highway" – Verkhnyaya Medveditsa – Razinkovo), 27 km from the nearest railway halt Bukreyevka (railway line Oryol – Kursk).

The rural locality is situated 31 km from Kursk Vostochny Airport, 144 km from Belgorod International Airport and 231 km from Voronezh Peter the Great Airport.

References

Notes

Sources

Rural localities in Kursky District, Kursk Oblast